The siege of Jaffa was a military engagement between the French army under Napoleon Bonaparte and Ottoman forces under Ahmed al-Jazzar. On the 3 of March, 1799, the French laid siege to the city of Jaffa, which was under Ottoman control. It was fought from 3 to 7 March 1799.  On the 7 March, French forces managed to capture the city.

Background
Having taken control of Alexandria and Cairo and losing control of the territories under Cairo, despite having his ships destroyed, Napoleon Bonaparte was continuing his push on the Ottoman territories in the Middle East. Having recently captured an Ottoman fortress at El Arish, he was looking to cement his foothold in the Levant. In early March, his troops reached Jaffa (modern Tel Aviv).

Siege
The city of Jaffa was surrounded by high walls, and extensive fortifications had been constructed by the Ottomans. Ahmed al-Jazzar entrusted its defence to his troops, including 1,200 artillerymen. Napoleon had to win Jaffa before he could advance any further, and the whole expedition's success depended on its capture. The city was one of Greater Syria's main mercantile centres and had a harbour that would provide vital shelter for the French fleet. All the exterior works could be besieged and a breach was feasible. When Bonaparte sent an officer and a trumpeter to Ahmed al-Jazzar to order the surrender of the city, Ahmed decapitated the messengers and ordered a sortie. The sortie was pushed back as early as the evening of the same day. The French managed to destroy one of the towers on the city fortifications, and despite resistance by its defenders, Jaffa was taken. 

According to some sources, the French messengers who had brusquely told the city of Napoleon's ultimatum ended up being arrested, tortured, castrated and decapitated and their heads impaled on the city walls. That harsh treatment led Napoleon, when the city fell, to allow his soldiers two days and two nights of slaughter and rape. He also executed the Ottoman governor, Abdallah Bey. Bonaparte no longer wished to honour the promises of his stepson Eugène de Beauharnais for prisoners' lives to be spared and ordered that a large part of the Ottoman prisoners (according to some sources around 2,440, according to other sources 4,100), most of them Albanians, be executed by being shot or stabbed to death with bayonets.

Napoleon's eulogists later wrote of that decision: "For, to keep in submission so considerable a number of prisoners, it would have been necessary to detach guards for them, which would have severely diminished his army's numbers; and if he had allowed them to leave free men, it was reasonable to fear that they might swell the ranks of Ahmed al-Jazzar's troops".

Aftermath

Napoleon also allowed hundreds of local citizens to leave the city, hoping that the news they would carry of Jaffa's fall would intimidate the defenders of the other cities in the Eyalet and Syria. This backfired, since their news instead made these defenders fight all the more fiercely.

Meanwhile, a plague epidemic caused by poor hygiene in the French headquarters in Ramla decimated the local population and the French army alike. Overcome in the north of the country by the Ottomans, Napoleon abandoned Palestine.  After his departure the British, allied to the Ottomans and commanded by William Sidney Smith, rebuilt Jaffa's city walls.

In the years 1800 to 1814, after a new nine-month siege, Jaffa was again taken over by Napoleon's former opponent, Ahmed al-Jazzar, Acre's governor.

References

External links

French campaign in Egypt and Syria
Sieges of the Napoleonic Wars
Conflicts in 1799
Sieges involving France
Sieges involving the Ottoman Empire
Prisoner of war massacres
1799 in the Ottoman Empire
1799 in Ottoman Syria
Siege of Jaffa
Massacres committed by France
Jaffa
Battles inscribed on the Arc de Triomphe